The Big Squeeze is a compilation album by Snoop Dogg. It will be followed by a "Making of..." DVD called Niggaracci Presents: Cooked Up Crack. Snoop Dogg produces most of the songs, credited under the alias Niggaracci. The first single is "Hat 2 Tha Bacc" by Westurn Union. The Big Squeeze debuted at #71 on the Billboard 200 Chart and #5 on the Rap Albums Chart. Being a Koch release, it also peaked at the Top Independent Albums Chart on the 4th spot. As a compilation, it scored the third position on the related chart.

Track listing

Videos 
 Westurn Union featuring Snoop Dogg - "Hat 2 Tha Bacc"

References

External links 
 Snoop Dogg on Myspace
 Niggaracci on Myspace
 JT the Bigga Figga on Myspace
 
 Snoop Dogg interview
 Snoop Dogg Helms Big Squeeze Compilation
 Koch Records
  Military Minded Productions 

Albums produced by Terrace Martin
Record label compilation albums
Snoop Dogg compilation albums
Albums produced by David Banner
Albums produced by Soopafly
2007 compilation albums
E1 Music compilation albums
Gangsta rap compilation albums
G-funk compilation albums